Patan is a small village in Salumbar tehsil, Udaipur district, Rajasthan, India.

References

Villages in Udaipur district

Patan is the small village of Slumber Block that village nearest of Jaismand Lake  it was the very beautiful village